The Adventures of Super Mario Bros. 3 is an animated television series. It premiered on September 8, 1990, on NBC. It is the second animated series to be based on Nintendo's Mario video game series and is loosely based on the video game Super Mario Bros. 3. The animation was provided by Sei Young Animation.

Overview
Unlike its predecessor, the series dropped the use of live-action segments, Wart's minions and King Koopa's alter-egos, featured an entirely new cast (with the exceptions of John Stocker and Harvey Atkin, who reprised their respective roles as Toad and King Koopa), established a level of continuity in stories, and introduced a set of characters called the Koopalings, based upon the same characters from the Mario games but with different names. Episodes were divided into two segments of around 11 minutes each, always opened by a title card featuring world-map footage taken from Super Mario Bros. 3, and often featured the use of power-ups and other elements from the game.

Format
The Adventures of Super Mario Bros. 3 focuses on Mario, Luigi, Toad, and Princess Toadstool, who reside in the Mushroom World. Most of the episodes revolve around the four characters' efforts to prevent the attacks made by King Koopa and the Koopalings to take over Princess Toadstool's Mushroom Kingdom.

Like The Super Mario Bros. Super Show!, the show was produced by DIC Animation City, with the overseas animation being done at the South Korean studio Sei Young Animation Co., Ltd., although the show was co-produced by Italian studio Reteitalia S.P.A.

Since the show was based on Super Mario Bros. 3, the enemies and power-ups were also seen in the show. In addition to being more faithful to Mario gameplay, the series was given an established sense of continuity, something that the previous series lacked. Many episodes are set on Earth (consistently referred to as "The Real World" by the characters) and are set in locations such as Brooklyn, London, Paris, Venice, New York City, Cape Canaveral, Miami, Los Angeles, and Washington, D.C. One episode titled "7 Continents for 7 Koopas" is about the Koopalings invading each of the seven continents.

This cartoon was originally shown in the hour-long Captain N and The Adventures of Super Mario Bros. 3 programming block along with the second season of Captain N: The Game Master on NBC, whose format involved having two Mario Bros. episodes with a full-length Captain N episode sandwiched in-between. All further airings of the series separated it from Captain N when Weekend Today aired in 1992. Also that year, it was included in Rysher Entertainment's Captain N and the Video Game Masters syndication package.

Voice cast 
The TV series entered production before official names were given to new characters in the development of the video game, so the Koopalings' names are all different.

 Walker Boone as Mario
 Tony Rosato as Luigi
 Tracey Moore as Princess Toadstool
 John Stocker as Toad
 Harvey Atkin as King Koopa
 James Rankin as Cheatsy (Larry) Koopa
 Dan Hennessey as Bully (Roy) Koopa
 Tabitha St. Germain (as Paulina Gillis) as Kootie Pie (Wendy O.) Koopa
 Gordon Masten as Big Mouth (Morton) Koopa
 Michael Stark as Kooky (Ludwig) von Koopa
 Stuart Stone as Hip (Lemmy) Koopa
 Tara Charendoff as Hop (Iggy) Koopa

Home media

North America
In 1994, Buena Vista Home Video released 4 VHS volumes of the series which each contained 2 episodes. 

In 2003, Sterling Entertainment released a VHS/DVD titled King Koopa Katastrophe, which contained 6 episodes. The DVD release also contained the Sonic Underground episode "Sonic Tonic" as a bonus feature. The DVD was re-released by NCircle Entertainment in 2007, excluding the Sonic episode. A DVD featuring one episode plus two Heathcliff episodes was released as a prize in Golden Grahams cereal in 2004.

Due to the success of the DVD sets of The Super Mario Bros. Super Show!, Shout! Factory and Vivendi Visual Entertainment released a three-disc box set of The Adventures of Super Mario Bros. 3 with all twenty-six original episodes on June 26, 2007, which was released again in a double pack with Adventures of Sonic the Hedgehog volume 1 as a double pack on December 4 the same year, as a tie-in with Mario & Sonic at the Olympic Games. NCircle Entertainment (under license from Cookie Jar Entertainment) has also released the series in 4 volumes as well as the Collector's Edition of the complete series.

The show was re-released to Steam by Cinedigm in July 2015.

The original broadcast version of Adventures of Super Mario Bros. 3 features covers of licensed songs on five episodes and two Milli Vanilli songs on one episode. Due to copyright restrictions (or in Milli Vanilli's case, due to their 1989 lip-syncing scandal), the complete series DVD sets from both Shout! Factory and NCircle Entertainment use the song "Mega Move" from Captain N: The Game Master in place of the licensed songs. However, the King Koopa Katastrophe DVD from Sterling Entertainment/NCircle Entertainment features three of the six episodes with the original broadcast music still intact.

Internationally
The show has also been released on DVD in Australia in a full box set made by MRA Entertainment. 

In Europe, Disky Communications released three volumes with six episodes each in the UK, Germany and the Netherlands. A fourth volume, containing six more episodes, has only been released in Germany.

References

External links

 

Animated series based on Mario
1990s American animated television series
1990 American television series debuts
1990 American television series endings
1990 Italian television series debuts
1990 Italian television series endings
American children's animated action television series
American children's animated adventure television series
American children's animated comedy television series
American children's animated fantasy television series
American television shows based on video games
Italian children's animated action television series
Italian children's animated adventure television series
Italian children's animated comedy television series
Italian children's animated fantasy television series
Canadian children's animated action television series
Canadian children's animated adventure television series
Canadian children's animated comedy television series
Canadian children's animated fantasy television series
NBC original programming
Animated television series about brothers
Television series by DIC Entertainment
Television series by DHX Media
English-language television shows
Television series based on Mario
Television shows filmed in Toronto
Television shows filmed in California